Jalal Toufic is a Lebanese artist, filmmaker, and author of various publications.

Born to an Iraqi father and a Palestinian mother, he has lived in Lebanon for about seventeen years, and his work often reflects his heritage.

He is co-publisher and co-editor, with Gilbert Hage, of Underexposed Books.

Publications
Distracted (1991)
(Vampires): An Uneasy Essay on the Undead in Film (1993)
Over-Sensitivity (1996)
 Forthcoming (2000)
 Undying Love, or Love Dies (2002)
 ‘Âshûrâ’: This Blood Spilled in My Veins (2005) 
 Two or Three Things I’m Dying to Tell You (2005)
Undeserving Lebanon (2007)
The Withdrawal of Tradition Past a Surpassing Disaster (2009)
Graziella: The Corrected Edition (2009)
What Is the Sum of Recurrently? (2010)
The Portrait of the Pubescent Girl: A Rite of Non-Passage (2011)
What Were You Thinking? (2011)
The Dancer's Two Bodies (2015)
What Was I Thinking? (2017)

Exhibitions

Group exhibitions
Cycles of Collapsing Progress, curated by Karina El Helou and Anissa Touati, Rashid Karami International Fair, Tripoli, Lebanon, 2018
 Beirut Lab: 1975(2020) Curated by Juli Carson and Yassmeen Tukan, University Art Gallery, University of California, Irvine, 2019

References

External links
Official Site

Interview with Jalal Toufic

Living people
Lebanese writers
Lebanese people of Iraqi descent
Lebanese people of Palestinian descent
Lebanese contemporary artists
Lebanese filmmakers
Iraqi artists
Year of birth missing (living people)